Women's freestyle 68 kilograms competition at the 2020 Summer Olympics in Tokyo, Japan, took place on 2–3 August 2021 at the Makuhari Messe in Mihama-ku. The qualification rounds were held on 2 August while medal matches were held on the 2nd day of the competition. 

This freestyle wrestling competition consists of a single-elimination tournament, with a repechage used to determine the winner of two bronze medals. The two finalists face off for gold and silver medals. Each wrestler who loses to one of the two finalists moves into the repechage, culminating in a pair of bronze medal matches featuring the semifinal losers each facing the remaining repechage opponent from their half of the bracket. 

Tamyra Mensah-Stock from the United States won the gold medal after beating Blessing Oborududu from Nigeria 4–1 in the gold medal match.

Schedule
All times are Japan Standard Time (UTC+09:00)

Results
 Legend
F — Won by fall

Main bracket

Repechage

Final standing

References

Wrestling at the 2020 Summer Olympics
Women's events at the 2020 Summer Olympics
2021 in women's sport wrestling